Dexter Wendell Jackson Davis (born March 20, 1970) is a former American football defensive back who played for the Phoenix Cardinals and Los Angeles/St. Louis Rams in the National Football League (NFL). He played college football at Clemson University.

Early life and education 
Davis played high school football at Sumter High School. He then attended and played college football at Clemson University from 1988–1990. In his collegiate career, he had 10 interceptions including a touchdown from one of them. He was also a punt returner, having 37 punt returns for 269 yards.

Professional career

Phoenix Cardinals 
Davis was drafted by the Cardinals in the fourth round of the 1991 NFL Draft with the 86th pick overall. He spent his first 3 years with them. He played in 33 games and started in 3 of them. He had 33 tackles and 2 interceptions while on the team.

Los Angeles/St. Louis Rams 
Davis spent the last 3 years of his career playing with the Rams. He played in 26 games and started in 3. He had 25 tackles while on the team.

References 

1970 births
Living people
American football defensive backs
Clemson Tigers football players
Arizona Cardinals players
Los Angeles Rams players